George Ritter Burnett  (April 23, 1858 – November 1, 1908) was a United States Army officer who received the U.S. military's highest decoration, the Medal of Honor.

Life and career
Burnett graduated from the United States Military Academy in 1880. On August 16, 1881, he was serving as a second lieutenant with the 9th Cavalry Regiment of the Buffalo Soldiers. On that day, Burnett participated in the Battle of Cuchillo Negro Creek in the Black Range Mountains near Cuchillo Negro Creek of New Mexico, where he was cited for helping rescue stranded soldiers under heavy fire. One of his privates, Augustus Walley, and a first sergeant, Moses Williams also received the Medal of Honor for actions in this battle. He retired due to injuries in February 1891. He subsequently served as a colonel in the Iowa National Guard from 1892 until 1905, and in the Missouri National Guard from 1905 until 1908.

Burnett served as United States Vice Consul and Acting Consul in Kehl, Baden, Germany from September 1905 to March 1907. He also worked at many military preparatory schools.

Medal of Honor citation
Rank and organization. Second Lieutenant, 9th U.S. Cavalry. Place and date: At Cuchillo Negro Mountains, N. Mex., August 16, 1881. Entered service at: Spring Mills, Pa. Birth. Lower Providence Township Pa. Date of issue: July 23, 1897.

Citation:
Saved the life of a dismounted soldier, who was in imminent danger of being cut off, by alone galloping quickly to his assistance under heavy fire and escorting him to a place of safety, his horse being twice shot in this action.

See also

List of Medal of Honor recipients for the Indian Wars
List of United States Military Academy alumni (Medal of Honor)

References

Buffalo Soldiers
1858 births
1908 deaths
United States Army Medal of Honor recipients
Burials at Arlington National Cemetery
United States Military Academy alumni
American Indian Wars recipients of the Medal of Honor